{{Infobox election
| election_name     = 2004 United States Senate election in Iowa
| country           = Iowa
| flag_image        = Flag of Iowa (xrmap collection).svg
| type              = presidential
| ongoing           = no
| previous_election = 1998 United States Senate election in Iowa
| previous_year     = 1998
| next_election     = 2010 United States Senate election in Iowa
| next_year         = 2010
| election_date     = November 2, 2004
| image_size        = x150px

| image1            = Chuck Grassley official photo.jpg
| nominee1          = Chuck Grassley
| party1            = Republican Party (United States)
| popular_vote1     = 1,038,175
| percentage1       = 70.2%

| image2            = Arthur Small-2010-08-14 (cropped).jpg
| nominee2          = Arthur A. Small
| party2            = Democratic Party (United States)
| popular_vote2     = 412,365
| percentage2       = 27.9%

| map_image         = 2004 United States Senate election in Iowa results map by county.svg
| map_size          = 220px
| map_caption       = County results Grassley:     
| title             = U.S. Senator
| before_election   = Chuck Grassley
| before_party      = Republican Party (United States)
| after_election    = Chuck Grassley
| after_party       = Republican Party (United States)
}}

The 2004 United States Senate election in Iowa''' was held on November 2, 2004. Incumbent Republican United States Senator Chuck Grassley ran for re-election to a fifth term in the United States Senate. Grassley and former State Senator Arthur A. Small won the Republican and Democratic primaries, respectively, unopposed, and faced each other in the general election. Though this election coincided with the highly competitive presidential election, Grassley was not considered vulnerable and defeated Small in a landslide. , this is the last time a Republican Senate candidate won Johnson County.

Democratic primary

Candidates 
 Arthur A. Small, attorney, lobbyist, and former Iowa State Senator

Results

Republican primary

Candidates 
 Chuck Grassley, incumbent United States Senator

Results

General election

Predictions

Results

See also 
 2004 United States Senate elections

References 

2004 Iowa elections
Iowa
2004